Upper St. Clair is a township with home rule status in southern Allegheny County, Pennsylvania, United States, located approximately 8 miles (13 km) south of Downtown Pittsburgh. It is known for being an affluent suburb with a nationally recognized school district. As of the 2010 census, the township population was 19,229.

Around 9% of the township's area is dedicated to 14 parks and multiple fields, totaling approximately 733 acres. The township has six borders with neighboring communities, including South Fayette Township to the west, Bridgeville to the northwest, Scott Township and Mt. Lebanon to the north, Bethel Park to the east, and Peters Township in Washington County to the south.

Etymology 
St. Clair Township was named after General Arthur St. Clair of Revolutionary War fame, the ninth President of the United States in Congress Assembled. Under his administration as president from February 2, 1787, to October 29, 1787, the Northwest Ordinance and United States Constitution of 1787 were passed.

History
The first European settler in present-day Upper St. Clair was John Fife, who settled near what is now the intersection of Washington and McLaughlin Run roads in 1762.

St. Clair was one of the original townships of Allegheny County, Pennsylvania at the county's creation in 1788. In 1836, the St. Clair Township was divided into two separate townships, Upper St. Clair and Lower St. Clair. The residents of Upper St. Clair formed their township to ensure better government service that could be obtained by separating from the more densely populated northern part of the township. Upper St. Clair Township was further subdivided throughout the 19th and 20th centuries as several parts of the original township separated to form new townships and boroughs. In 1973, Upper St. Clair Township adopted a home rule charter that took effect on January 5, 1976, and is no longer governed by the Pennsylvania Township Code.

The Whiskey Rebellion of 1794 had its roots in Upper St. Clair.

Formed as a volunteer militia company in 1844 by residents of the township, the "St. Clair Guards" later became Company H of the 62nd Pennsylvania Infantry.

The community was home to several mines beginning in the late 19th century. Freehold Real Estate Co. built the first major residential development in March 1913 along Washington Road, which at the time was conveniently close to streetcar service.

Today, the community has many fashionable homes and is considered one of the wealthiest suburbs of Pittsburgh. The township has also gained fame as being a filming location for the movie The Perks of Being a Wallflower.

Geography

Education
Upper St. Clair is served by a namesake public school district, consisting of three elementary schools (Baker, Eisenhower, and Streams), two middle schools (Boyce and Fort Couch), and a single Upper St. Clair High School. In addition, a church named for St. Louise de Marillac hosts a private Catholic-affiliated school serving from Pre-K to 8th grade. A K-8 school for students with special needs known as the Wesley School also operates within the township.

Demographics

As of the census of 2000, there were 20,053 people, 6,966 households, and 5,823 families residing in the township.  The population density was 2,055.7 people per square mile (794.1/km2). There were 7,091 housing units at an average density of 726.9/sq mi (280.8/km2).  The racial makeup of the township was 93.79% White, 0.18% African American, 0.02% Native American, 4.02% Asian, 0.02% Pacific Islander, 0.07% from other races, and 0.62% from two or more races. Hispanic or Latino people of any race were 0.78% of the population.

There were 6,966 households, out of which 60.8% had children under the age of 18 living with them, 76.3% were married couples living together, 5.6% had a female householder with no husband present, and 16.4% were non-families. 15.0% of all households were made up of individuals, and 9.0% had someone living alone who was 65 years of age or older. The average household size was 2.81 and the average family size was 3.14.

In the township the population was spread out, with 28.3% under the age of 18, 4.3% from 18 to 24, 22.6% from 25 to 44, 28.3% from 45 to 64, and 16.4% who were 65 years of age or older. The median age was 42 years. For every 100 females there were 93.7 males. For every 100 females age 18 and over, there were 89.1 males.

Government and politics
The structure of Upper St. Clair is a managerial government along with an elected Board of Commissioners consisting of seven members. In a Commission/Manager form of government, the main responsibility of the Board of Commissioner is to function as a policy-making body of government, while the managerial body is responsible for the administrative functions of the Township.

Matthew R. Serakowski is the current Township Manager and Mark S. Mansfield is the current Assistant Township Manager. The elected Board of Commissioners are Mark D. Christie (President), Nicholas J. Seitanakis (Vice President), Russell Del Re, C. Elise Logan, Robert W. Orchowski, Daniel R. Paoly, and Ronald J. Pardini.

Jonathan Wharton is the current Chief of Police, who was appointed in August 2018.

Notable people
 Sean Casey, former Major League Baseball first baseman, current baseball analyst for MLB Network
 Stephen Chbosky, novelist, screenwriter, and film director best known for the coming-of-age novel The Perks of Being a Wallflower
 Dave Giusti, former American Major League baseball pitcher, chiefly for the Pittsburgh Pirates
 Chuck Greenberg, former owner of the Texas Rangers and Altoona Curve; born and raised in Upper St. Clair; raised his family in the township
 Todd Haley, former head coach of the Kansas City Chiefs; former offensive coordinator of the Pittsburgh Steelers, Arizona Cardinals, and Cleveland Browns.
 Tunch Ilkin, former NFL player and Steelers broadcaster
 Anthony Jeselnik, stand-up comic
 Sean Lee, former NFL linebacker
 Grant Lewis, former NHL defenseman
 Ryan Malone, former NHL forward and Olympic athlete
 Greg Miller, animator and television director
 Dylan Reese, former NHL defenseman

References

External links

 Upper St. Clair Township official website
 U.S. News & World Rankings

Townships in Allegheny County, Pennsylvania
Pittsburgh metropolitan area
Home Rule Municipalities in Allegheny County, Pennsylvania